Ioannis Antoniou (born 27 January 1995) is an alpine skier from Greece. He competed for Greece at the 2018 and 2022 Winter Olympics.

References

1995 births
Living people
Greek male alpine skiers
Alpine skiers at the 2018 Winter Olympics
Alpine skiers at the 2022 Winter Olympics
Olympic alpine skiers of Greece
Sportspeople from Lamia (city)